John David Miles (born August 15, 1947) is an American politician. He served as a Democratic member for the 107th district of the Georgia House of Representatives.

Life and career 
Miles was a businessperson.

In 1981, Miles was elected to represent the 107th district of the Georgia House of Representatives, succeeding A. D. Clifton. He served until 1983, when he was succeeded by Jimmy Lord.

References 

1947 births
Living people
Democratic Party members of the Georgia House of Representatives
20th-century American politicians